Julio Cesar Rodríguez (born 28 June 1966) is a Colombian former cyclist. He competed in the team time trial at the 1988 Summer Olympics.

References

1966 births
Living people
Colombian male cyclists
Olympic cyclists of Colombia
Cyclists at the 1988 Summer Olympics
Place of birth missing (living people)